In French contexts, an hôtel particulier is a townhouse of a grand sort. Whereas an ordinary maison (house) was built as part of a row, sharing party walls with the houses on either side and directly fronting on a street, an hôtel particulier was often free-standing, and by the 18th century it would always be located entre cour et jardin, between the entrance court, the cour d'honneur, and the garden behind.

There are many hôtels particuliers in Paris. Numerous hôtels particuliers have survived the transformation of Paris over the centuries to form part of the city’s heritage. Some hôtels particuliers have also been turned into museums, like the Musée Carnavalet, Musée Picasso in the Marais, the Musée Rodin, Musée de la Légion d'honneur  in the 7th arrondissement, the Musée Nissim de Camondo, Musée Cernuschi and the Musée Jacquemart André in the 8th arrondissement.



Gallery

Hôtels particuliers in Paris

Hôtels particuliers

Former hôtels particuliers

See also 

 List of monuments historiques in Paris

External links 
 Monuments historiques de Paris, Base Mérimée
 Hôtels particuliers, Paristoric

 
Hôtels particuliers
hôtels particuliers in Paris